Icicle is the name of two supervillains appearing in comic books published by DC Comics: Joar Mahkent and Cameron Mahkent (father and son; to differentiate between the two, the suffixes, Senior and Junior, are used).

A version of the character appeared in the fifth season of the Arrowverse show The Flash, portrayed by Kyle Secor. This version is Thomas Snow who is the father of Caitlin Snow. Icicle also appeared as Jordan Mahkent, leader of the Injustice Society and the main antagonist of The CW television show Stargirl, portrayed by Neil Jackson while Hunter Sansone appeared as his son Cameron Mahkent.

Publication history
The Joar Mahkent version of Icicle first appeared in All-American Comics #90 and was created by Robert Kanigher and Irwin Hasen.

The Cameron Mahkent version of Icicle first appeared in Infinity, Inc. #34 and was created by Roy Thomas, Dann Thomas, and Todd McFarlane.

Fictional character biographies

Dr. Joar Mahkent
When noted European physicist Dr. Joar Mahkent arrived in America with his latest scientific discovery, spectators at dockside were astonished to witness the luxury liner upon which Mahkent was traveling suddenly frozen solid in Gotham Harbor. Investigating this phenomenon, the original Green Lantern (Alan Scott) was shocked by the sight of Dr. Mahkent shot dead in his stateroom, apparently the victim of Lanky Leeds, a notorious racketeer who was reportedly traveling on the same ship. Thus, when the bizarrely costumed criminal known as the Icicle appeared upon the scene later that same day, wielding a unique weapon capable of instantly freezing solid any moisture in the air, Green Lantern presumed he was actually Lanky Leeds, who had stolen Doctor Mahkent's invention. After several frustrating encounters, Green Lantern ultimately unmasked the Icicle as Joar Mahkent himself, who had, in fact, murdered Lanky Leeds, using his cold ray gun to temporarily disguise Leeds' face as his own. Attempting to escape from Green Lantern, the Icicle leaped off a 20-story building and apparently plunged to his death in the Gotham River far below.

Actually, the Icicle survived his fall into the river, and returned to plague the Emerald Gladiator time and time again, eventually becoming a member of the Wizard's second Injustice Society of the World which succeeded in briefly hypnotizing the Justice Society of America. During their Patriotic Crimes, the Icicle stole the Washington Monument. Later he was a founding member of the Crime Champions of Two Earths, along with the Wizard and the Fiddler, which teamed up with a trio of crooks from Earth-1 after the Fiddler accidentally discovered a way to travel between worlds. The Icicle committed a million-dollar robbery on Earth-2 and escaped Hourman and Doctor Fate. He was defeated by Doctor Fate while robbing a museum on Earth-1. The Justice League and the Justice Society were captured and imprisoned in cages in space by the Crime Champions though, but escaped with the help of the Green Lanterns. All the villains were then captured.

The Icicle met his death during the Crisis on Infinite Earths, when he and several other supervillains attempted to invade the laboratory of the renegade Oan known as Krona.

The storyline Batman: Hush revealed that, as young children, Bruce Wayne and Thomas Elliot witnessed a fight between Alan Scott and the Icicle during a visit in Metropolis, which inspired both of them to consider the importance of the tactical expertise that they would use in their future costumed careers.

Joar Mahkent has been identified as one of the deceased villains entombed below the Hall of Justice.

Cameron Mahkent
Cameron Mahkent has no need for a cold ray gun as his father's prolonged exposure to the weapon altered his genetics, allowing him to biologically pass down to his son the ability to freeze objects and people or to lower the temperature of a room or other area. Cameron's skin pigmentation was also affected, making him appear to be albino.

Cameron became the second Icicle shortly before joining the Wizard's Injustice Unlimited group. It was during the period of the DC miniseries Legends (1986), the people of America were turned against their heroes, and a law was made that no one could operate as a crimefighter legally wearing a costume. This did not affect the villains much, as they were already breaking the law. For the new Icicle, it proved an opportune time to join with other super-criminals. He joined the Wizard in his new Injustice Society – called Injustice Unlimited. The group overcame the security at the International Trade Conference in Calgary, Alberta, Canada - namely Infinity, Inc. and a contingent of the Global Guardians - and forced the heroes to help in some mayhem. The Icicle was given the mission of finding and retrieving the man-monster called Solomon Grundy. He took with him the still-hypnotized Icemaiden and Jade and they traveled to the Arctic Circle. They were successful in the mission and brought back the white-skinned behemoth to Calgary, just in time to interfere with the escape plans of the Wizard. The plan of blackmailing the wealthy businessmen went haywire when Hourman (Rick Tyler) revived and freed himself. In the confusion of the battle, however, Cameron was able to escape.

Only weeks later he again joined with Artemis and Hazard, as well as the new Harlequin, the Dummy and Solomon Grundy. The Dummy wanted to head a revived Injustice Unlimited and planned to murder the members of Infinity Inc. to make a name for themselves. Their first target - Skyman - was successfully killed by the Harlequin and then Icicle went after Brainwave Jr. After believing the mental mutant dead, the Icicle returned to his cohorts. A plan was hatched to bring all the remaining Infinitors to Stellar Studios and kill them, a plan defeated only by the unwillingness of Hazard to cooperate and the sudden reappearance of Brainwave Jr. and Jade (both of whom had been thought dead). The Icicle nearly killed Brainwave Jr. in hand-to-hand combat, but was knocked out by Jade. In the end, Cameron was given over to law enforcement.

Later, after he engaged in battle against the second Star-Spangled Kid, S.T.R.I.P.E. and Starman, he joined the new Injustice Society at the invitation of Johnny Sorrow, who released him from his prison cell. During Stealing Thunder, when the Ultra-Humanite remade the world after acquiring control of Johnny Thunder's Thunderbolt, he was forced to help the 'reserve JSA'- consisting of Captain Marvel, Hourman, the third Crimson Avenger, Power Girl, Sand and Jakeem Thunder- against the Ultra-Humanite, since they were the only other people free in the world created by the Ultra-Humanite. He was later offered a position in the JSA by Sand but turned him down saying that he only fought with Sand for his own reasons.

Cameron does not care about his father's Golden age villainous legacy. He became a villain, not because of legacy, but because he is not a nice guy. He is a far more ruthless foe than his predecessor. He has begun a relationship with his teammate, the Tigress.

As part of the Superman/Batman "Public Enemies" arc, the Icicle is part of a multi-villain attack on Superman and Batman in Washington D.C. Despite working with other cold themed villains such as Killer Frost and Captain Cold and having the backing of President Lex Luthor, the Icicle and all the villains are soundly defeated.

During the Infinite Crisis storyline, Cameron popped up as a member of Alexander Luthor, Jr.'s Secret Society of Super Villains.

One Year Later, he is approached by Mirror Master to join the Suicide Squad for a mission.

On the cover of Justice League of America #13 (vol. 2), it shows Icicle as a member of the new Injustice League, though this was not corroborated by the story.

He can seen as the member of Libra's Secret Society of Super Villains.

Icicle and Tigress appear in the "Hourman and Liberty Belle" Second Feature in JSA All Stars. The story involves them alternately working with and against the heroic couple in a quest to locate a magical artifact. He and Tigress are expecting a baby, which appears to threaten Tigress' health. Icicle is trying to 'raise' money for expensive treatments.

In 2011, The New 52 rebooted DC's continuity. The Green Team encountered Icicle on a meteor which he hijacked from Bellachek Temple to give to his client. He begins to attack the Green Team by freezing their shuttle. As Icicle continues his attack, he kills Paul who recognizes Icicle as Cameron. Icicle continues the attack until the meteor breaks into different fragments.

In 2016, DC Comics implemented another relaunch of its books called "DC Rebirth" which restored its continuity to a form much as it was prior to "The New 52". Icicle appears at a villain award show at the Hall of Doom that is hosted by Harley Quinn.

James and Doyle Christie
Joar Mahkent's grandchildren briefly adopt their grandfather's name. James Christie, having adopted Joar's methods, is caught by Doyle Christie who briefly becomes a superhero.

Other versions

JLA/Avengers
The Cameron Mahkent version of Icicle and other cold-themed villains are seen among the enthralled villains defending Krona's stronghold in JLA/Avengers.

Justice League Adventures
Based in the DC animated universe, the Joar Mahkent version of Icicle is part of a group of ice-themed villains called the "Cold Warriors" which also consisted of Captain Cold, Cryonic Man, Killer Frost, Minister Blizzard, Mr. Freeze, Polar Lord, and Snowman. They tried to overthrow the small African nation of Bijouti.

DC Super Friends
Based in the DC Super Friends universe, the Cameron Mahkent version of Icicle is part of a group of ice-themed villains called the "Ice Pack" which consists of Blue Snowman, Captain Cold, Killer Frost, Minister Blizzard, and Mr. Freeze. They plot involved them encasing a city in ice and snow.

Flashpoint
In the alternate timeline of the Flashpoint event, the Cameron Mahkent version of Icicle is a member of Deathstroke's pirates. Icicle aided Deathstroke in attacking Warlord's fleet. After an attack by Aquaman and Ocean Master, Icicle was asked by Sonar to free him, which Icicle agreed to do. After Warlord's ships were destroyed by Jenny Blitz, Icicle joined in a mutiny against Deathstroke, but Deathstroke and Blitz overheard this and killed the crew members for their treachery. Icicle is killed by having his head blown off by Blitz.

In other media

Television

Animation
 Icicle appears in the 1980s Super Friends "Post Super Heroes Create a Villain Contest" cereal commercial.
 A character based on Icicle called Dr. Blizzard appears in the Justice League two-part episode "Legends", voiced by Corey Burton.
 Cameron Mahkent / Icicle Jr. appears in Young Justice, voiced by Yuri Lowenthal. This version is a member of the Light and the subgroup Onslaught who forms a friendship with Superboy.
 Additionally, Joar Mahkent / Icicle Sr. appears in the episode "Terrors", voiced by James Remar. This version is also a member of the Light and an inmate of the Belle Reve prison.
 An unidentified Icicle appears in the Robot Chicken DC Comics Special, voiced by Tom Root. This version is a member of the Legion of Doom.

Live-action
 The Cameron and Joar Mahkent incarnations of Icicle appear in the Smallville two-part episode "Absolute Justice", portrayed by Wes Mack and Gardiner Millar respectively. Joar was an enemy of the Justice Society of America (JSA) until Hawkman put him in a vegetative state after he killed Hawkgirl. Under Amanda Waller's orders, Joar's son Cameron murders Sylvester Pemberton / Star-Spangled Kid, Sandman, and Doctor Fate. Following these, Cameron visits his father and reveals his plans to him before disabling his life support and donning Doctor Fate's Helmet of Fate. Crashing into the Watchtower, he attacks and fights members of the JSA and Justice League before the Martian Manhunter intervenes and helps the heroes defeat Cameron. After Hawkman removes the Helmet of Fate, Cameron is subsequently imprisoned in a heated room in a Checkmate facility, where Waller reveals he succeeded in bringing the team back together so they could save the world from "a coming apocalypse". When Cameron protests, Waller shoots and kills him.
 A variation of Icicle appears in season five of The Flash, portrayed by Kyle Secor. This version is Dr. Thomas Snow, the father of Caitlin Snow. The first half of season five sees Caitlin searching for her father, who had seemingly died 20 years earlier, after discovering that his death certificate was faked. In the episode "The Icicle Cometh", Caitlin, Barry Allen, and Cisco Ramon find Thomas and learn that he was attempting to find a cure for his and Caitlin's ALS genes, which resulted in them both gaining cryokinetic powers. He then claims that unlike his daughter, who developed a split personality called "Killer Frost", he never developed one and is dying, with a serum based on Caitlin's DNA  being the only cure. Eventually however, Team Flash discovers that he did develop an alternate personality, later dubbed "Icicle", who was in control of Thomas' body the whole time and that he needed the serum to kill his other self. Icicle's plan is foiled when Killer Frost destroys the serum, forcing him to flee. In the episode "Snow Pack", Icicle returns to eliminate Caitlin and her mother, Carla Tannhauser's, human sides, but Thomas finds the strength to retake control. When Cicada attacks Caitlin, Thomas sacrifices himself to save her and dies in her arms.
 A variation of Joar Mahkent named Jordan Mahkent appears in Stargirl, portrayed by Neil Jackson. This version is the leader of the Injustice Society of America (ISA) who lost his wife Christine (portrayed by Amanda Lavasanni) to an unspecified illness and is supported in his campaign by his parents Sofus and Lily (portrayed by Jim Franco and Kay Galvan respectively), the latter of whom also shares his powers. Ten years prior to the series, Icicle led the ISA in attacking the Justice Society of America (JSA)'s headquarters; killing several of their members and fatally wounding their leader Starman himself. In the years since, he settled down in Blue Valley as a businessman in his civilian identity and became the founder of Blue Valley business, The American Dream. Throughout season one, Jordan meets with the ISA to discuss the rise of Starman's successor, Stargirl, and her efforts to rebuild the JSA before leading the ISA in enacting "Project: New America", but Stargirl's JSA foil their plans. After sustaining damage while fighting her and S.T.R.I.P.E., Jordan is shattered by Mike Dugan using his dad's truck. After the final battle, however, he secretly revived himself in a liquid form before eventually reconstituting himself in the following year, though he is forced to constantly focus to maintain his physical form. After forming an alliance with the Ultra-Humanite and Dragon King and killing Sportsmaster and Tigress, Jordan reunites with his family and claims to Stargirl that he has reformed while his accomplices cripple her JSA. While fighting the heroes, Lily is killed by a falling car while Jordan is shattered once more by Cameron. Three months later, Jordan reconstituted himself once more and fled to Copenhagen, but is found by Sportsmaster and Tigress' daughter, Artemis Crock, who burns him alive.
 Cameron Mahkent also appears in the series, portrayed by Hunter Sansone as a young adult and Roger Dale Floyd as a child. This version is a student at Blue Valley High School and classmate of Stargirl who develops cryokinesis late into season one. In season three, he enters a relationship with Stargirl until he learns she had a hand in his father's apparent death. Despite this, he attempts to reconcile with her and eventually joins the JSA in defeating Icicle before leaving with Sofus.

Film
 The Cameron Mahkent incarnation of Icicle was reportedly featured in David S. Goyer's script for a Green Arrow film project titled Escape from Super Max.
 The Cameron Mahkent incarnation of Icicle appears in Superman/Batman: Public Enemies, voiced by Michael Gough. This version is a member of the "Cold Warriors".
 The Flashpoint incarnation of Joar Mahkent / Icicle appears in Justice League: The Flashpoint Paradox. This version is killed by Atlantean  soldiers during Aquaman's attack on Deathstroke's ship, the Ravager.

Video games
The Young Justice incarnation of Cameron Mahkent / Icicle appears as a boss in Young Justice: Legacy, voiced again by Yuri Lowenthal.

References

Articles about multiple fictional characters
Characters created by Robert Kanigher
Characters created by Roy Thomas
Characters created by Todd McFarlane
Comics characters introduced in 1947
Comics characters introduced in 1987
DC Comics male supervillains
DC Comics metahumans
DC Comics scientists
Earth-Two
Fictional assassins in comics
Fictional characters with ice or cold abilities
Fictional inventors
Fictional physicists
Golden Age supervillains